Giolla Críost Brúilingeach (fl. 1440) was a noted Scottish harper and poets. He was mentioned in the Book of the Dean of Lismore, which possibly identifies him with Leim of Gigha, and with the MacBhreatnaigh (Galbraiths) of that island.

His poetry includes Scottish and Irish subjects, including one to Conochobar Óg MacDiarmada of Moylurg (1458), a chief in Connacht, requesting a new harp as a fee.

References
 McLeod, Wilson - Divided Gaels
 Thomson, Derick (ed.) The Companion to Gaelic Scotland Gairm publications (Glasgow) 1994 
 Watson, Roderick  (1995) The Poetry of Scotland: Gaelic, Scots and English, 1380-1980

Scottish harpists
Scottish poets
Medieval Gaels from Scotland
People from Argyll and Bute
15th-century Scottish people
Isle of Gigha